Sunset Falls is the final of the three waterfalls on the South Fork Skykomish River. The falls drop  in a long, narrow, powerful chute. In high water, because of several potholes in the falls, water can sometimes shoot out as much as 30 feet.

Access 

Public access to Sunset Falls currently does not exist.

Running of Sunset Falls 

On May 30, 1926, daredevil stunt performer Al Faussett ran the falls in a canoe with hundreds of people watching from the rocks beside the falls.  He escaped with only brief and minor inner pains.  He later went on to run Eagle Falls as well as many other falls in Oregon and Idaho.

Several local kayakers, most notably Rob McKibbin and Sam Grafton have run Sunset Falls successfully.  It is considered a class 6 rapid, with unavoidable and potentially deadly hazards.

References 

Waterfalls of Snohomish County, Washington
Waterfalls of Washington (state)